Black Conflux is a 2019 Canadian drama film directed by Nicole Dorsey. The film stars Ella Ballentine as Jackie, a teenage girl in Newfoundland and Labrador whose quest for independence leads her into the orbit of Dennis (co-star Ryan McDonald), a mentally unstable and potentially violent man in his twenties.

The cast also includes Luke Bilyk, Olivia Scriven, Sofia Banzhaf and Lawrence Barry.

The film premiered at the 2019 Toronto International Film Festival, and was commercially screened on the Digital TIFF Bell Lightbox in 2021.

Production
A key scene in the film is set to Gowan's 1987 single "Moonlight Desires". The film also alludes to Brian Damude's 1975 thriller film Sudden Fury, with a scene in which Dennis is watching the film on video.

Critical response
Norman Wilner of Now gave the film a four-N rating, writing that "while Black Conflux functions primarily as a character study (with excellent work from the leads, and strong support provided by Olivia Scriven and Sofia Banzhaf), it’s also about showing us the environment that shapes those characters – and the odds against their ever escaping it." Nikki Baughan of Screen Daily also reviewed the film positively, stating that the film "doesn’t offer anything groundbreaking in terms of its narrative, but is nevertheless a striking calling card for its talented maker."

Matt Bobkin of Exclaim! was more critical, asserting that "the film's strong beginning and middle showcases plenty of strengths: strong acting, natural dialogue and rich cinematography", but concluding that it was ultimately undermined by an anticlimactic ending.

Stephan Dalton of The Hollywood Reporter wrote the first International review and praised the film for its "strong visual aesthetic”, and "sufficient depth and polish to secure more festival bookings”. The review takes note of cinematographer Marie Davignon's "gorgeous imagery”, actor Ella Ballentine's "luminous acting", and notes about director Nicole Dorsey’s work that “even if this deceptively artful debut feels a little muted and unpolished in places, it is plainly the work of a skilled filmmaker with ample future potential.”

David Davidson of The Globe and Mail praised the film, writing that "it is rare for a first feature to be so well directed, thoughtful and entertaining" and comparing it to Anne Wheeler's 1986 film Loyalties and Lynne Stopkewich's 2000 film Suspicious River "with their atmosphere of dread and depiction of rural life as a hotbed of sexual fantasies and violence".

Awards
In December 2019, the film was named to TIFF's annual year-end Canada's Top Ten list.

The film received two Canadian Screen Award nominations at the 8th Canadian Screen Awards in 2020, for Best Actor (McDonald) and the John Dunning Best First Feature Award.

References

External links
 

2019 films
Canadian coming-of-age drama films
English-language Canadian films
Films set in Newfoundland and Labrador
Films shot in Newfoundland and Labrador
2010s coming-of-age drama films
2010s English-language films
2010s Canadian films